Jane Lewis is a Scottish sports journalist and broadcaster, who was a sports presenter for Scotland Today, STV Central's now-defunct regional news programme.

Career 
Lewis joined Scotland Today in April 1999 after previous stints with BBC radio and Sky News.

As a result of mass redundancies both in the newsroom and technical support division, Lewis, along with presenters Shereen Nanjiani and Sarah Heaney all took voluntary redundancy. She signed off from the news programme on 24 April 2006.

References

External links

BBC Scotland newsreaders and journalists
Living people
Scottish television presenters
Scottish women television presenters
STV News newsreaders and journalists
Year of birth missing (living people)
British women television journalists
Scottish radio presenters
Scottish women radio presenters